International Hospital Kampala (IHK) is a 100-bed private hospital in Kampala, Uganda and is part of  the International Medical Group, the largest private healthcare group in Uganda.

Location
The coordinates of International Hospital Kampala are:0°18'19.0"N, 32°36'40.0"E (Latitude:0.305289; Longitude:32.611112).

History
IHK became operational in 2000, and was founded by Dr. Ian Clarke, a general practitioner and tropical medicine specialist, born in Northern Ireland. The hospital initially opened at a smaller premises in Old Kampala, before relocating to its current home in 2004. Since its opening in 2000, IHK has pioneered in a number of areas. The first open heart surgery was done at the hospital. It was also one of the first facilities in Uganda to do laparoscopic (keyhole) surgery.

In 2012, IHK signed a management agreement with Fortis Hospital Group (FHG), based in Delhi, India.  The relationship brought a number of benefits to IHK including skill sharing and training. In 2015, majority shares in International Medical Group were sold to CIEL Limited,a leading Mauritius-based investment holding company, through its wholly owned subsidiary CIEL Healthcare Limited (CHL).

The services offered at IHK include the following:

Operations
, the following specialty services were available at IHK. The list is not exhaustive:

Rescue services are provided within Uganda by road to a preferred health centre where possible. IHK's ambulances are fully equipped and are staffed with experienced medical staff able to handle minor and major emergencies.

Corporate and social responsibility
Hope Ward, an initiative started in 2006, aims to provide complex treatment for the destitute. It was initially a dedicated medical and surgical war, and was eventually turned into the paediatrics ward as there was more of a demand for this. Patients are now treated on the relevant wards. Patients have included the following;

 Trauma victims from the war in Northern Uganda who required plastic surgery
 Both adults and children with cancer related complications
 Both adults and children with HIV related complications
 Burns and acid attacks
 Patients with fistula 
 Children born with birth defects

Availability of funding determines how many and how often patients are treated. Funding comes from sponsors (individuals and corporations) and fundraising with IHK, discounting costs from 10% to 100%.

Previous sponsors include Babulal Ruparelia, Stanbic Bank Uganda and Bead for Life. The annual Hope Ward run is one of the main events.

Other CSR includes free treatment of HIV and TB patients through the Touch Namuwongo clinic, an International Medical Foundation initiative, community outreaches in partnership with several others and medical sponsorship at CSR events.

See also
 Kampala Capital City Authority
 Hospitals in Uganda
 List of universities in Uganda
 Kiwoko Hospital
 Kampala Hospital
 Nakasero Hospital
 Ian Clarke
 Clarke International University
 List of medical schools in Uganda

References

External links
 Website of International Hospital Kampala
 The companies of IMG

Hospital buildings completed in 1996
Hospitals in Kampala
Makindye Division
Kampala Capital City Authority
Teaching hospitals in Uganda